Alan David Robertson (born 22 September 1952) is a Scottish football coach and former player. A one-club man, he made 607 appearances in all competitions (586 in the Scottish League and the two major domestic cups, a club record) for Kilmarnock at left back.

As of 2020 Robertson is the manager of West of Scotland Football League side Bonnyton Thistle; assisted by another former Kilmarnock player, Paul Wright.

References

1952 births
Living people
Footballers from Irvine, North Ayrshire
Association football fullbacks
Kilmarnock F.C. players
Troon F.C. players
Scottish Junior Football Association players
Scottish Football League players
Scottish footballers
Kilmarnock F.C. non-playing staff
Hamilton Academical F.C. non-playing staff

Association football coaches
Scottish football managers